Pelicaria  is a genus of sea snail, a marine gastropod mollusc in the family Struthiolariidae.

Species
 † Pelicaria arahura Beu, 2010
 † Pelicaria canaliculata (Zittel, 1864)
 † Pelicaria cestata Marwick, 1965
 † Pelicaria clarki (Neef, 1970)
 † Pelicaria granttaylori Beu, 2010
 † Pelicaria lacera (Marwick, 1931)
 † Pelicaria marima (Neef, 1970)
 † Pelicaria monilifera (Suter, 1914)
 † Pelicaria nana (Marwick, 1926)
 † Pelicaria parva (Suter, 1915)
 † Pelicaria procanalis Beu, 1970
 † Pelicaria pseudovermis (Bartrum & Powell, 1928)
 † Pelicaria rugosa (Marwick, 1924)
 Pelicaria vermis (Martyn, 1784)
 † Pelicaria zelandiae (P. Marshall & R. Murdoch, 1920)
Species brought into synonymy
 Pelicaria acuminata (Marwick, 1924): synonym of Pelicaria vermis (Martyn, 1784)
 Pelicaria convexa (Marwick, 1924): synonym of Pelicaria vermis (Martyn, 1784)
 Pelicaria fossa (Marwick, 1924): synonym of Pelicaria vermis (Martyn, 1784)
 † Pelicaria mangaoparia Vella, 1953: synonym of Pelicaria vermis (Martyn, 1784)
 †  Pelicaria marwicki Finlay, 1931: synonym of † Tylospira marwicki (Finlay, 1931) (original combination)
 † Pelicaria rotunda Vella, 1953: synonym of Pelicaria vermis (Martyn, 1784)

References

 
 Gray, J. E. (1857). Guide to the systematic distribution of Mollusca in the British Museum. Part I. (Gastropoda). British Museum, London, xii + 230 pp

Struthiolariidae
Gastropods of New Zealand